Under Heavy Fire, also known as Going Back, is a 2001 American feature war film directed by Sidney J. Furie and starring Casper Van Dien, Jaimz Woolvett, Bobby Hosea, Joseph Griffin, Carre Otis, Kenneth Johnson, Daniel Kash, Martin Kove. It was filmed under the title Going Back in the Philippines and Vietnam in April and May 2000. Post-production continued in Canada for another 14 months.

Synopsis
Twenty-five years since the Vietnam War ended, a group of American veterans return to Vietnam and meet up with TV journalist Kathleen Martin (played by Carre Otis), who is assigned to cover the reunion of the men from Echo Company, a Marine Rifle Company, who fought in the Vietnam War. Soon, they are joined by their old Captain named Ramsey (played by Casper Van Dien), and they revisit the old battlefields they fought in and experience flashbacks of their time in the war during 1968. The film explores many of the wounds war inflicts on soldiers that last for a lifetime. It also portrays the Vietnamese today as a very forgiving people.

Cast
Casper Van Dien as Capt. Ramsey
Jaimz Woolvett as Tex
Bobby Hosea as Ray
Joseph Griffin as Red Fuentes
Kenny Johnson as Jimmy Joe
Carré Otis as Kathleen
Daniel Kash as Eric
Martin Kove as Father Brazinski
Austin Farwell as Doc Jordan
Jason Blicker as Fred
Jim Morse as Gunny Bailey
Deborah Zoe as Irene
Pablo Espinosa as Chico

External links

2001 television films
2001 films
Canadian war films
Anti-war films about the Vietnam War
Films directed by Sidney J. Furie
Vietnam War films
Films shot in the Philippines
2000s English-language films
2000s Canadian films